"If I Could Turn Back Time" is a song by American singer and actress Cher from her 1989 nineteenth studio album Heart of Stone. It was released as the album's lead single in July 1989, by Geffen Records. The song was written specifically for Cher by Diane Warren, who produced it in collaboration with Guy Roche. Cher initially rejected the song after listening to a demo sung by Warren, but subsequently changed her opinion after the latter forced her to record it. The lyrics talk about the feelings of remorse due to bad deeds and the willingness to reverse time to make things right.

"If I Could Turn Back Time" is a pop rock and soft rock song that features instrumentation from guitars, piano and drums. The song received mostly positive reviews from music critics, who applauded its overall production and Cher's vocal performance, with some considering it to be a highlight of the album. Commercially, the song peaked at number three on the Billboard Hot 100 and became Cher's first number-one hit in Australia. It also reached the top 10 of the record charts in Belgium, Canada, Ireland, Netherlands, New Zealand, and the United Kingdom.

The accompanying music video for "If I Could Turn Back Time", directed by Marty Callner, was shot on board of the battleship  and portrays Cher performing for the ship's crew, wearing a leather thong that revealed her tattooed buttocks and straddling a cannon. Military personnel condemned the video, while some family groups protested against its broadcast, because they deemed it offensive for the Navy and controversial. Following these protests, MTV was forced to air the video after the 9pm watershed.

"If I Could Turn Back Time" has been performed on seven of Cher's concert tours, most recently on the Here We Go Again Tour in 2018–2020, and at the 1989 MTV Video Music Awards. The song has been covered by a number of artists and has also been featured on the soundtrack of Deadpool 2 (2018), among others. "If I Could Turn Back Time" is noted for the mayhem surrounding its music video and has been considered one of Cher's most representative songs and a testament to her longevity, with her ability to continuously reinvent herself and remain relevant and contemporary.

Background
The song was written by Diane Warren, who produced the song along with Guy Roche. While the soft rock track was specifically written for Cher, the singer initially disliked the song upon hearing a demo and turned it down. Warren claimed in 1991: "I got on my knees and pleaded. I told her I wasn't going to leave the room until she said yes, and finally, just to get rid of me, she did." In 2014, she further added: "She really hated [it], but I held her leg down during a session and said, 'You have to record it!'" According to Warren, Cher reportedly responded: "'Fuck you, bitch! You're hurting my leg! OK, I'll try it.' Once Cher sang it, she gave me this look like, 'You were right'."

Critical reception
Gary Hill of AllMusic retrospectively wrote that the song "has a crunchy texture to it, albeit in a poppy, '80s Starship sort of arrangement." The Daily Vault's Mark Millan noted it as a "soft-rock anthem". Music & Media described it as "a well-produced FM sing-along."

Music video
The music video for "If I Could Turn Back Time", directed by American television director Marty Callner, takes place on board the battleship . It depicts Cher and her band performing a concert for the ship's crew. The video was filmed in Los Angeles on Friday night, June 30, 1989, while the ship was stationed at the former Long Beach Naval Shipyard at Pier D. In the video, the band plays on the foredeck, and the ship is rigged with spotlights, light racks and strobes. Cher's son, Elijah Blue Allman, 12 at the time, appears as one of the band's guitarists wearing dark glasses and a Jimi Hendrix T-shirt.

The Department of the Navy had granted permission for the music video shoot because of its potential for boosting Navy recruitment: the Navy did not have a budget for TV ads in 1989. The Navy initially selected the battleship  for the video. However, New Jersey was out to sea when Callner needed to do an initial site survey, so he toured her sister ship, Missouri, instead. During Callner's visit, Missouris public affairs officer, Lieutenant Mark Walker, convinced him to change the filming location to Missouri.

Cher's outfit for the original video, a fishnet body stocking under a black one-piece bathing suit that left most of her buttocks (and a tattoo of a butterfly) exposed, proved very controversial, and many television networks refused to show the video. MTV first banned the video, and later played it only after 9 PM. A second version of the video was made, including new scenes and less overtly sexual content than the original. The outfit and risque nature of the video were a complete surprise to the Navy, who expected Cher to wear a jumpsuit for the concert, as presented on storyboards during original discussions with producers. The sailors were already in place and the band had begun playing when Cher emerged in her outfit. Lieutenant Commander Steve Honda from the Navy's Hollywood Liaison office requested Callner briefly suspend shooting and convince Cher to change into more conservative attire, but Callner refused.

The Navy received criticism for allowing the video shoot, especially from World War II veterans who saw it as a desecration of a national historic site that should be treated with reverence: USS Missouri was the site of the Empire of Japan's surrender on September 2, 1945, thus ending World War II.

No Navy officials were disciplined for their role in supporting the video, although reportedly the Secretary of the Navy briefly considered firing the captain of USS Missouri.

In 2003, Cher released her Living Proof: Farewell Tour concert on DVD which included an official "If I Could Turn Back Time" remix video.

Live performances

Cher performed the song on the following concert tours:
 Heart of Stone Tour (1989–1990)
 Love Hurts Tour (1992)
 Do You Believe? Tour (1999–2000)
 The Farewell Tour (2002–2005)
 Cher at the Colosseum (2008–2011)
 Dressed to Kill Tour (2014)
 Classic Cher (2017–2020)
 Here We Go Again Tour (2018–2020)

Track listings
 US and European 7-inch and cassette single
 "If I Could Turn Back Time" (remix) – 3:59
 "Some Guys" – 3:59

 European 12-inch single
 "If I Could Turn Back Time" (rock guitar version) – 4:06
 "Some Guys" – 3:59
 "Kiss to Kiss" – 4:23

 European CD single
 "If I Could Turn Back Time" (rock guitar version) – 4:06
 "If I Could Turn Back Time" (7-inch version) – 3:59
 "I Found Someone" (7-inch version) – 3:42

Personnel
 Cher – lead vocals
 Desmond Child, Maria Vidal, Michael Anthony, Robin Beck, Jimmy Demers, Jean McClain – backing vocals
 Steve Lukather, Glenn Sciurba, Gene Black – electric guitar
 Guy Roche, Alan Pasqua – keyboard
 John Pierce – bass guitar
 Mark T. Williams – drums, tambourine

Production
 Arranged and produced by Diane Warren and Guy Roche
 Recorded by Frank Wolf, with assistance from Guy Roche
 Mixed by Frank Wolf
 Published by Realsongs

Charts and certifications

Weekly charts

Year-end charts

Certifications and sales

Appearances in the media
The song is featured in a post-credit scene in the 2018 film Deadpool 2.

In the film Walking on Sunshine, there is a version of this song performed by the protagonists Taylor (Hannah Arterton) and Raf (Giulio Berruti).

The song was used in the 2019 commercial for Luminess Silk Foundation makeup products.

References

1989 songs
1989 singles
Cher songs
Number-one singles in Australia
Songs written by Diane Warren
Music videos directed by Marty Callner
Geffen Records singles
Music video controversies
Obscenity controversies in music
Rock ballads
1980s ballads